Phymatopus californicus, the lupine ghost moth, is a species of moth belonging to the family Hepialidae. It was described by Jean Baptiste Boisduval in 1868 and is known from the US state of California.

The wingspan is about 40 mm.

Recorded food plants for the species include Lupinus, Baccharis and Eriophyllum. There is one generation per year. Females drop hundreds to thousands eggs while flying over patches of lupine bushes. First- and second-instar larvae develop in the soil under lupines and feed on the exterior of the upper portions of lupine tap root. By mid-to-late spring, the larvae burrow into the plants, forming feeding galleries inside the central shoot and the upper part of the central tap root. Several larvae may be found in a single plant. Pupation occurs in the fall.

References

Hepialidae
Moths described in 1868
Moths of North America
Taxa named by Jean Baptiste Boisduval